His Mother's Boy is a 1917 American silent drama film directed by Victor Schertzinger and written by Ella Stuart Carson. The film stars Charles Ray, Doris May, William Elmer, Josef Swickard, Jerome Storm, and Gertrude Claire. It is based on the short story "Where Life is Marked Down" by Rupert Hughes. The film was released on December 24, 1917, by Paramount Pictures.

Plot
As described in a film magazine, Matthew Denton (Ray) finds out that, because the Centipede oil wells do not pay a dividend, the villagers consider his father to be a swindler. He leaves his mother and New England home to go to Centipede, Texas, to ascertain the cause of the shortage of oil. He becomes an employee under the direction of Banty Jones (Elmer), foreman of the wells, and a crook. He falls in love with Mabel Glenny (May), whom Jones considers to be his "gal." When Mabel shows Matthew her engagement ring, Jones gives him a specified amount of time to get out of town. However, Matthew has found a valve that causes oil to be diverted to another company. He also learns that Jones is receiving the benefit from these stolen oil sales. A fight breaks out between the two men with Matthew the winner. Jones, humiliated, leaves, and Mabel is proud of Matthew. Back home the villagers are happy that the oil wells are safe and that dividends will be forthcoming again.

Cast

Reception
Like many American films of the time, His Mother's Boy was subject to cuts by city and state film censorship boards. The Chicago Board of Censors required a cut of the shooting of a man in the barroom, the intertitle "Well, he can have you when I get through with you", and two closeups of men in a fight where Matthew bites the man's hand, Matthew is thrown against the wall, and Matthew shoots the man.

References

External links
 

1917 films
1910s English-language films
Silent American drama films
1917 drama films
Paramount Pictures films
Films directed by Victor Schertzinger
American black-and-white films
Films based on works by Rupert Hughes
American silent feature films
1910s American films